The  (French) or  (Dutch) is a former quarter located in central Brussels, Belgium. The district was centred around Saint Mary Magdalene's Church between the /, the / and the current /. It was largely destroyed starting in the 1920s with the works of the North–South connection, a major railway link through central Brussels, to develop the area for Brussels Central Station and other modern office buildings. Many historic structures were lost in the demolition process.

Some of the area was redeveloped in the 1980s and 1990s with varying degrees of success, with buildings in the New Classical architecture and the New Brick Renaissance style, following the principles of New Urbanism and the European Urban Renaissance. The name of the street has survived to this day.

See also

 Granvelle Palace, a demolished palace in the district
 History of Brussels
 Belgium in "the long nineteenth century"

References

Notes

Neighbourhoods of Brussels
City of Brussels
New Urbanism communities